Holke is a surname. Notable people with the surname include:

Heinrich Holk, also spelled Holke, a 17th-century Danish-German mercenary
Walter Holke (1892–1954), a 20th-century American baseball player